Clarence Parfitt (born 16 July 1944 in Bermuda) is a former Bermudian and Scottish cricketer. He was a left-handed batsman and left-arm medium pace bowler. He is reputed to be the greatest bowler that Bermuda has produced. He started his career in his native Bermuda, playing one first-class match against New Zealand in 1972, taking five wickets in New Zealand's only innings. It was the maiden first-class match to be played by the Bermuda cricket team. He also represented Bermuda in the 1979 ICC Trophy.

He later settled in Scotland and would go on to play for the Scottish cricket team on twelve occasions, including nine List A matches, between 1988 and 1990, making his debut against Derbyshire. He is now a Development Officer for Cricket Scotland, and was inducted into Bermuda's sporting hall of fame in 2004.

References

External links
Cricket Archive profile
Cricinfo profile
Cricket Europe Stats Zone biography

1944 births
Living people
Bermudian cricketers
Scotland cricketers
Bermudian cricket administrators
Scottish cricket administrators
Bermudian emigrants to Scotland
People from St. George's Parish, Bermuda